Paterson railway station is located on the North Coast line in New South Wales, Australia. It serves the town of Paterson. It is serviced by NSW TrainLink Hunter line services travelling between Newcastle and Dungog. The station opened on 14 August 1911, and its original wooden station building is still in place.

Platforms & services
Paterson station consists of a single platform. It is serviced by NSW TrainLink Hunter line services travelling between Newcastle and Dungog. There are five services in each direction on weekdays, with three on weekends and public holidays.

Opposite the platform is a crossing loop. In the mid-1980s, the Rail Motor Society established its base on the site of the former freight yard opposite the station.

References

External links
Paterson Station details Transport for New South Wales

Railway stations in the Hunter Region
Railway stations in Australia opened in 1911
Regional railway stations in New South Wales
Short-platform railway stations in New South Wales, 2 cars